Barbara Munjas (born 7 December 1988) is a Croatian singer and songwriter. She is most known as the lead vocalist lyricist for the rock band Barbari and former vocalist of the group Gustafi. Munjas began to establish herself as a solo artist with the release of the single "Men" in 2018. In March 2022, Munjas released her debut album Right Place & Right Time through Aquarius Records.

Life and career
Barbara Munjas was born on 7 December 1988 in Rijeka, Croatia and grew up in the nearby town of Ika.

Munjas released her debut single "Ti si tu" in 2007. With "Ti si tu" she participated in Dora 2007. Performing first in the second semi-final with a total of 11 points thus placing 12th, she failed to advance to the final. Later the same year, she joined folk-rock band Gustafi. She was the main female vocalist until she left the band in 2012. A year later, in 2013, Munjas formed the rock band Barbari with her as the lead vocalist. The band released two studio albums, Monfiorenzo underground in 2013 and Santa Barbara in 2014. Since 2018 Munjas has been active as a solo musician. Her debut album Right Place & Right Time was released in 2022 through Aquarius Records. Based on the album's performance, Munjas earned a nomination at the fifth annual Rock&Off Awards in the category "Album of The Year" for it.

On 9 December 2022, Munjas was announced as one of the 18 participants in Dora 2023, the national contest in Croatia to select the country's Eurovision Song Contest 2023 entry, with the song "Putem snova".

Discography

Albums

Singles

Awards and nominations

Notes

References

External links

1988 births
Croatian rock singers
Musicians from Rijeka
21st-century Croatian women singers
Living people